= Yuichi Tohmori =

Yuichi Tohmori from the NTT Electronics, Kanagawa, Japan was named Fellow of the Institute of Electrical and Electronics Engineers (IEEE) in 2015 for contributions to tunable semiconductor lasers for optical fiber communications.
